Piotr Kurpios (born 4 April 1963 in Częstochowa) is a Polish politician, local official, doctor associated with Częstochowa.

He was the acting mayor of Częstochowa from 2009 to 2010, due to dismiss in referendum former mayor, Tadeusz Wrona. Kurpios belonged to Civic Platform.

References

1963 births
People from Częstochowa
Living people
Civic Platform politicians
Mayors of places in Poland
21st-century Polish politicians